Lake Cote, originally known as Lake Cóter, is a fresh water crater lake located in the northern highlands of Costa Rica. Its depth varies between 6 and 18 meters.

Location 

Located in Cote district, Guatuso canton, of Alajuela province, between the Arenal Volcano and Tenorio Volcano. Nearby is located the largest lake in Costa Rica, Lake Arenal, of artificial origin.

Physical aspects 

It is a crater lake of Maar type with a heart-like ovoid shape and a 1 km diameter. Average depth is of 6.30m and maximum depth is 18m at the center area.

It is the natural drainage of River Cote.

Average water temperature is around 21.9 °C and 27.9 °C.

Uses 

The lake is used for tourism, subsistence fishing, hydropower electricity generation and as a conservation area. It is regarded as a sacred place by the local Maleku people.

Cote UFO 

 On 4 September 1971, during an aerial survey by the National Geographic Institute of Costa Rica, what looks like a UFO was photographed over Lake Cote (see photo).

References 

Geography of Alajuela Province
Geography of Guanacaste Province
Tourist attractions in Alajuela Province
Tourist attractions in Guanacaste Province
Cote